Expressway S22 or Express Road S22 (in Polish Droga ekspresowa S22) is a single carriageway express road running from Elbląg to the border with Russia at Grzechotki-Mamonovo, where it connects to a Russian road that continues to Kaliningrad. The border crossing on the road opened in December 2010 and is the largest one on the Polish-Russian border, making S22 the key transport connection between the European Union and the Kaliningrad Oblast.

The road follows the route of a German single carriageway autobahn between Elbląg (Elbing) and Kaliningrad (Königsberg) built in the 1930s, known informally as Berlinka.  The old autobahn was completely reconstructed and opened as an express road in September 2008.  In the course of the upgrade, the new modern carriageway was built in the space left for the second carriageway during original construction.  At the same time, the original concrete carriageway was demolished almost along the entire length of the route, and only a few traces of it remain.  All of the remaining original overpasses and bridges were demolished and replaced with modern works.  Thus very few traces of the original German autobahn can be seen.

The construction of the road cost 483 mln PLN, of which over one third was provided by the European Union.

Route description

References

External links

Photos of the road before reconstruction
Aerial photo of border crossing taken in 2007 from the Polish side of the border

Expressways in Poland